Lawrence Eliot Klein is an historian and fellow at Emmanuel College, University of Cambridge. Klein is a specialist in the cultural history of eighteenth-century Britain and particularly ideas and practices associated with the concept of politeness.

Selected publications
 Shaftesbury and the Culture of Politeness: Moral Discourse and Cultural Politics in Early Eighteenth-Century England, Cambridge University Press, 1994.
 Enthusiasm and Enlightenment in Europe, 1650-1850 (co-edited with Anthony LaVopa), Huntington Library Press, 1998
 Edition of Shaftesbury's Characteristicks of Men, Manners, Opinions, Times, Cambridge University Press, 1999.

References 

Fellows of Emmanuel College, Cambridge
University of Rochester alumni
Johns Hopkins University alumni
Stanford University Department of History faculty
University of Nevada, Las Vegas faculty
Living people
Year of birth missing (living people)